Lee Sun-kyu (born ) is a South Korean male volleyball player. He currently plays for the Uijeongbu KB Insurance Stars.

Career

Clubs
Lee began his club career in 2003 after signing a contract with the Hyundai Capital Skywalkers.

Prior to the 2013–14 season, Lee was traded to the Samsung Fire Bluefangs for Yeo Oh-hyun.

Lee remained with the Bluefangs for three years before signing a contract with the KB Insurance Stars as a free agent on May 19, 2016.

Lee recorded his 900th career block on December 17, 2016. Lee is the only player in V-League history to over 900 blocks in a career. Lee also scored his 3,000th career point on November 22, 2017, becoming the only middle blocker in V-League history to over 3,000  points in a career.

National team
Lee first joined the national team program in 1999 as a member of the South Korean national under-18 team. He helped the team win gold at the 1999 Asian Youth Championship, and qualify for the 1999 World Youth Championship.

In 2003 Lee was a member of the collegiate national team which won the gold medal in the 2003 Summer Universiade defeating Japan in final. He also won the gold medal at the 2003 Asian Championship held in Tianjin, as part of the South Korean national team.

Lee was part of the national team at the 2006 FIVB World Championship in Japan, where the team finished in 17th place.

Lee had consistently participated in the FIVB World League after his debut in 2006 and made his seventh appearance in the tournament in 2017.

Individual awards

Club
 2016 V-League - Best Blocker

National Team
 2005 Asian Championship - Best Spiker

References

External links
 Lee Sun-kyu at the International Volleyball Federation (FIVB)

1981 births
Living people
South Korean men's volleyball players
Place of birth missing (living people)
Asian Games medalists in volleyball
Volleyball players at the 2006 Asian Games
Medalists at the 2006 Asian Games
Asian Games gold medalists for South Korea
Universiade medalists in volleyball
Universiade gold medalists for South Korea
21st-century South Korean people